Bellinger may refer to:

Names
 Bellinger (given name), a masculine given name
 Bellinger (surname), a surname

Places
 Bellinger, Wisconsin, an unincorporated community in Wisconsin, United States
Bellinger River, a river in the Mid North Coast of New South Wales, Australia.

See also
 Bellinger-Dutton